The Parliament of Eswatini (Swazi: Libandla) consists of two chambers:

The Senate (Upper Chamber) (Indlu yeTimphunga)
The House of Assembly (Lower Chamber)

The Houses of Parliament are located in Lobamba.

See also
 Politics of Eswatini
 List of legislatures by country

External links
 

Politics of Eswatini
Eswatini
Government of Eswatini
Eswatini
Eswatini
1967 establishments in Swaziland